"The Rain in Spain" is a song from the musical My Fair Lady, with music by Frederick Loewe and lyrics by Alan Jay Lerner. The song was published in 1956.

The song is a turning point in the plotline of the musical. Professor Higgins and Colonel Pickering have been drilling Eliza Doolittle incessantly with speech exercises, trying to break her Cockney accent speech pattern. With the three of them nearly exhausted, Eliza finally "gets it", and recites the sentence with all "proper" long-As. The trio breaks into song, repeating this key phrase as well as singing other exercises correctly, such as "In Hertford, Hereford, and Hampshire, hurricanes hardly ever happen", in which Eliza had failed before by dropping the leading 'H'.

Origin
The phrase does not appear in Shaw's original play Pygmalion, on which My Fair Lady is based, but it is used in the 1938 film of the play. According to The Disciple and His Devil, the biography of Gabriel Pascal by his wife Valerie, it was he who introduced the famous phonetic exercises "The rain in Spain stays mainly in the plain" and "In Hertford, Hereford, and Hampshire, hurricanes hardly ever happen" into the script of the film, both of which were later used in the song in My Fair Lady.

In other languages 
Versions of "The rain in Spain stays mainly in the plain" in various languages include:
 Danish: "En snegl på vejen er tegn på regn i Spanien" ("A snail on the road is a sign on rain in Spain")
 Dutch: "Het Spaanse graan heeft de orkaan doorstaan" ("The Spanish wheat has survived the hurricane")
 German: "Es grünt so grün, wenn Spaniens Blüten blüh'n" ("it turns so green when Spain's flowers bloom")
 Hebrew: "" ("Barad yarad bidrom sfarad haerev": Hail fell in southern Spain this evening.)
 Hungarian: "Lenn délen édes éjen édent remélsz."
 Italian: "La rana in Spagna gracida in campagna" ("The frog in Spain croaks in the country side")
 Polish: "W Hiszpanii mży, gdy dżdżyste przyjdą dni" ("It drizzles in Spain when come the rainy days")
 Spanish: "La lluvia en Sevilla es una pura maravilla" (The rain in Sevilla is a true marvel) playing with the sound of the "ll").

Usage in other popular culture

A 1985 British television commercial for Heineken parodies the scene. Sylvestra Le Touzel plays a woman who speaks posh, and after a drink of Heineken a cockney accent appears. It was ranked at number 9 in Campaign Live's 2008 list of the "Top 10 Funniest TV Ads of All Time", and at number 29 in Channel 4's list of the "100 Greatest TV Ads" in 2000.
1994 in the Greek TV series Oi Men Kai Oi Den. 
In the Family Guy episode "One If by Clam, Two If by Sea", Stewie tries to teach a girl to lose her Cockney accent. Together, he and Eliza sing a parody, "The Life of The Wife is Ended by the Knife."
The satirical revue Forbidden Broadway set up playwright David Mamet as being exasperated with Madonna's acting style with the lyrics, "I strain in vain to train Madonna's brain." The song is included on the album Forbidden Broadway, Vol. 2.
The Simpsons episode "My Fair Laddy" is itself a parody of My Fair Lady, and includes the song "Not On My Clothes" (with the lyrics, "What flows from the nose does not go on my clothes").
In Stephen King's book, The Gunslinger, he writes a parody titled "The Rain in Spain Falls Mainly on the Plain". King's novel 'Salem's Lot also features his changed lyrics recited by Mark Petrie.
In 2012, a punk rock version of "The Rain in Spain" was featured in comedy-musical TV series Glee, episode "Choke". The song was performed by Mark Salling (as his character Puck) and the guys of the series' fictional glee club New Directions.
In the 1956–59 revue At the Drop of a Hat, Michael Flanders observes in a brief comic monologue that: "Despite all you may have heard to the contrary, the rain in Spain stays almost invariably in the hills."
In the 1989 Doctor Who serial Ghost Light, companion Ace (played by Sophie Aldred) attempts to teach an alien stranded in Victorian England how to be "ladylike" by misquoting, "The rain in Spain falls mainly down the drain."
On the 32nd episode of the 5th season of the American version of the improvisational comedy series Whose Line Is It Anyway?, Colin Mochrie leads off a playing of "Weird Newcasters" with a report that Rudolph the Red-Nosed Reindeer was killed in a mid-air collision with a flock of seagulls and a Boeing 747, with the incident taking place over Barcelona. Mochrie concludes the report with the punchline, "Eyewitnesses report that the reindeer in Spain was hit mainly by the plane."
During the fourth episode of Orphan Blacks first season (2013), "Effects of External Conditions", Alison Hendrix practices her Cockney accent with the line.

References

External links
"Barad yarad bidrom sfarad": How "The Rain in Spain" Fell in Eretz-Israel, by Dan Almagor
 , 2001 London revival
 , 1998 live recording of "Hey, Mr. Producer!"
 , 1987 live recording of "An Evening with Alan Jay Lerner" (feat. Plácido Domingo, Liz Robertson, Richard Caldicot)

Phonetics
Songs with music by Frederick Loewe
Songs with lyrics by Alan Jay Lerner
Songs from My Fair Lady
1956 songs
Songs about Spain
Songs about language